A biological model is an organism or system representing a more complex biological entity. It may refer to:
 a model organism, a non-human species that is extensively studied to understand particular biological phenomena present in many related organisms
 an in vitro model system, representing complex in vivo systems
 a mathematical model of a biological system, e.g.,
 the biological neuron model, a mathematical description of the properties of certain cells in the nervous system
 a scientific model of a biological system, e.g.
 the fluid mosaic model
 Models of abnormality#The biological (medical) model, the only model of psychological abnormalities not based on psychological principles